"Nightmare at 20,000 Feet" is the third episode of the fifth season American television anthology series The Twilight Zone, based on the short story of the same name by Richard Matheson, first published in the short story anthology Alone by Night (1961). It originally aired on October 11, 1963 and is one of the most well-known and frequently referenced episodes of the series. The story follows a passenger on an airline flight who notices a hideous creature trying to sabotage the aircraft during flight.

In 2019, Keith Phipps of Vulture stated that the episode "doubles as such an effective shorthand for a fear of flying", making it endure in popular culture. This is the first of six episodes to be directed by Richard Donner.

Opening narration

Plot
While traveling by airplane, Robert Wilson sees a gremlin on the wing. He tries to alert his wife Julia and the stewardess. Every time someone else looks out of the window, the gremlin hides itself, so Robert's claim seems crazy. Robert admits the oddness of the gremlin avoiding everyone else's sight, but not his. His credibility is further undermined by this being his first flight since suffering a nervous breakdown six months earlier, which also occurred on an aircraft. Robert realizes that his wife is starting to think he needs to go back to the sanitarium, but his more immediate concern is the gremlin tinkering with the wiring under one of the engine cowlings, which could cause the aircraft to crash.

In response to his repeated attempts to raise an alarm about the gremlin, the flight engineer comes out to evaluate the situation and the stewardess gives Robert a sedative to stop him from alarming other passengers. Robert pretends to down it with water, but does not swallow and secretly spits it out. He then steals a sleeping police officer's revolver, straps himself in to avoid being blown out of the aircraft, and opens the emergency exit door in an attempt to eliminate the gremlin as he shoots it.

Once the airplane has landed, everyone believes that Robert has gone insane. In a straitjacket as he is whisked away on a gurney, Robert tells his wife that he is alone in his knowledge of what really happened during the flight. The final scene reveals conspicuous damage to the exterior of one of the aircraft's engines which will confirm to people that Robert was right all along.

Closing narration

Cast
 William Shatner as Bob Wilson
 Christine White as Julia Wilson
 Edward Kemmer as the flight engineer
 Asa Maynor as stewardess Betty Crosby
 Nick Cravat [uncredited] as the gremlin

William Shatner and Christine White each appeared in one earlier episode of the original series. Shatner starred in "Nick of Time" (October 1960) and White had the female lead in "The Prime Mover" (March 1961).

Remakes

Twilight Zone: The Movie version
The episode was remade in 1983 by director George Miller as a segment of Twilight Zone: The Movie. John Valentine, played by John Lithgow, suffers from severe fear of flying. The plane flies through a violent thunderstorm, and Valentine hides in the lavatory trying to recover from a panic attack, but the flight attendants coax him back to his seat. He notices a hideous gremlin on the wing of the plane and begins to spiral into another severe panic. He watches as the creature wreaks havoc on the wing, damaging the plane's engine. Valentine finally snaps and attempts to break the window with an oxygen canister, but is wrestled to the ground by another passenger (an off-duty security guard). Valentine takes the passenger's gun, shoots out the window (causing a breach in the pressurized cabin), and begins firing at the gremlin. This catches the attention of the gremlin, who rushes up to Valentine and destroys the gun, then leaps away into the sky. The police, crew, and passengers write off Valentine as insane. However, while a straitjacketed Valentine is carried off in an ambulance claiming that he's a hero, the aircraft maintenance crew arrives and finds the damage to the plane's engines, complete with claw marks which alerts everyone.

2019 version
Adam Scott was cast in an episode for the 2019 reboot series, entitled "Nightmare at 30,000 Feet". Other cast mates include Chris Diamantopoulos, China Shavers, Katie Findlay and Nicholas Lea. The remake removes the gremlin completely, though it makes a cameo as a doll (the original series gremlin) that washes up on the atoll near the end, and instead focuses on a sinister podcast hosted by the enigmatic Rodman Edwards (voiced by Dan Carlin).

Opening narration

Plot
Justin Sanderson is a magazine journalist suffering from PTSD, who is boarding Golden Airways Flight 1015 for a flight to Tel Aviv. While awaiting his flight, he befriends Joe Beaumont, a former pilot for the company and alcoholic who suffered some unspecified failure in the past.

At his seat, Sanderson discovers an MP3 player that has a podcast playing called Enigmatique, which describes a "Flight 1015" which was lost without explanation. Sanderson begins to panic and tries to make sense of the situation, but is told to calm down. He listens further and hears speculation about passengers who might have been involved somehow in the plane's disappearance; his attempts to investigate only to annoy the other passengers and crew. He learns that the last words heard from the pilot were "Good night, New York", and desperately tries to warn the pilot not to say that, but is restrained by an air marshal.

Beaumont approaches and confides that he believes him. Guessing that the flight number – and coincidental departure time – is the code to the cockpit, Sanderson gets Beaumont access, who overpowers the crew and takes control of the flight. As Beaumont subdues the passengers and crew with oxygen deprivation, he reveals his plan to crash the plane to atone for his past failures. As Beaumont signs off with "Good night, New York", it dawns on Sanderson that he indirectly causes the crash.

He awakens on an island and learns from the MP3 player that all the passengers and crew actually survived and were rescued, except for Sanderson who mysteriously disappeared. The other passengers and crew reveal themselves where they blame Sanderson for stranding them. Taking a nearby rock, he shouts to them that he saved their lives as he tells the approaching irate crowd to stay back. They start to beat Sanderson to death. The MP3 player is then picked up by Jordan Peele. The final shot pulls away from the distant fight scene and more approaching passengers to show the island and the burning wreckage of Golden Airways Flight 1015 offshore.

Closing narration

Reception

Accolades
Keith McDuffee of TV Squad listed the gremlin as the ninth scariest television character of all time in 2008.

In popular culture

The episode is considered one of the most popular of the series and parts of the plot have been repeated and parodied several times in popular culture, including television shows, films, radio and music:

Parodies
 On the October 20, 1984, episode of Saturday Night Live, in a skit with guest host Jesse Jackson, Ed Grimley sits next to Jackson on a plane, sees the gremlin, and disturbs Jackson, who eventually walks off the set.
 In The Simpsons episode "Treehouse of Horror IV" (1993) is a segment called "Terror at 5 1/2 Feet". It takes place on a school bus rather than an aircraft, and puts Bart Simpson in the role of Bob Wilson. An AMC Gremlin driven by Hans Moleman drives alongside the bus.
 In the 3rd Rock from the Sun episode "Dick's Big Giant Headache: Part 1" (1999), John Lithgow's character meets a character played by Shatner as he gets off an aircraft. When Shatner describes seeing something horrifying on the wing, Lithgow replies, "The same thing happened to me!" This references not only Lithgow's portrayal of the nervous passenger in the 1983 Twilight Zone remake, but also an earlier 3rd Rock episode "Frozen Dick" (Season 1, Ep 12, 1996) when he and Jane Curtin's characters were due to fly to Chicago to pick up awards before Dick panicked about something on the wing while the plane was still on the tarmac and gets them both kicked off the plane.
 On the March 16, 2010, episode of Saturday Night Live, guest host Jude Law plays Shatner's original role, while cast regular Bobby Moynihan is the gremlin on the wing of the jet. At one point, musical guest Pearl Jam are all on the wing as well, talking with the gremlin.
 In the July 7, 1996 episode "Whoopi Goldberg" of Muppets Tonight, Miss Piggy is bothered by a gremlin while riding in an airplane.  Miss Piggy goes to tell another passenger, who turns out to be William Shatner (playing himself). Shatner looks at the Gremlin and nonchalantly says, "Oh. Him again." He claims that he has been complaining about the gremlin for years, but nobody does anything about it.
 In Ace Ventura: When Nature Calls, Jim Carrey parodies Shatner and his character in this film.
 In the movie Sharknado 2: The Second One, Fin Shepard checks the wing of the plane, and sees a shark on the wing of the plane. The flight attendant tells him to calm down.
 The Lego Batman Movie features gremlins from the film Gremlins attacking a plane.
 In the Futurama episode "I Dated a Robot", the main characters watch a TV show entitled The Scary Door, which features a gremlin damaging a plane along with parodies of other story-lines from The Twilight Zone. In the season 7 episode, “Zapp Dingbat,” Zapp Brannigan says to Kif Kroker, “Kif, I’m bored. What say you go out on the wing and pretend you’re a gremlin.”
 In the 2015 sketch "Airplane Continental" of sketch comedy show Key & Peele, Peele's character encounters a gremlin while looking out the airplane window. Interestingly, Peele would later produce a non-parodic remake of this story for the 2019 Twilight Zone series, although omitting the gremlin (see above).

Other references
 American band Anthrax made a video (directed by Marcos Siega) for their 1998 song Inside Out inspired by this episode. 
 UK band Pop Will Eat Itself's 1990 album Cure for Sanity include the song "Nightmare at 20,000 feet". The track is said to be inspired by singer Clint Mansell's fear of flying.
 The episode inspired the opening sequence of the 2000 slasher movie Urban Legends: Final Cut, directed by John Ottman.
 In the 2014 horror film Flight 7500, a character watches the episode as part of the in-flight services, paralleling their own dire situation.
 A 1973 made-for-television horror film, unrelated to this episode of The Twilight Zone, similarly titled The Horror at 37,000 Feet, also co-stars William Shatner.

References

Notes

Bibliography

 DeVoe, Bill. Trivia from The Twilight Zone. Albany, Georgia: Bear Manor Media, 2008. .
 Grams, Martin. The Twilight Zone: Unlocking the Door to a Television Classic. Churchville, Maryland: OTR Publishing, 2008. .
 Groening, Matt, Ray Richmond and Antonia Coffman, eds. The Simpsons: A Complete Guide to Our Favorite Family. New York: HarperPerennial, 1997. . 
 Zicree, Marc Scott. The Twilight Zone Companion. Los Angeles: Sillman-James Press, 1982 (second edition). .

External links
 
 

1963 American television episodes
Adaptations of works by Richard Matheson
Television episodes written by Richard Matheson
Television shows based on short fiction
The Twilight Zone (1959 TV series season 5) episodes
Short stories about aviation
Gremlins